For the defunct U.S. record label see MTA Records

More Than  (MTA) Records is an independent record label founded by Chase & Status in 2009, specialising in "exceptional" music. The label releases a large variety of music including rap, soul, drum and bass, dubstep and deep house. It has played a pivotal role in the success of Nero, Redlight, 16bit, Ben Pearce among others, and many of its releases have charted in the United Kingdom.

On 19 February 2015, the label competed against Hospital Records, Black Butter Records and 3 Beat Records in BBC Radio 1Xtra's "Best of British Soundclash". Hosted by MistaJam, the event served as an unofficial sequel to Red Bull's Culture Clash 2014 (also hosted by MistaJam). MTA won, having received the most Twitter votes from listeners.

Artists
16bit
1991
Abigail Wyles
Bakersville
Catchment
Chase & Status
Dellux
Dimension
Franky Rizardo
Kill Them With Colour
Knytro
MANT
Moko
Moody Good
My Nu Leng
Nero
Nyko
Ossie
Scales
TCTS
Tru Fonix (a.k.a. Torqux)
Wyles & Simpson

Releases

Studio albums

Singles and EPs

Free releases

References

Record labels established in 2009
British independent record labels
Dubstep record labels
Drum and bass record labels
Electronic music record labels
British hip hop record labels